Beos may refer to:

 BeOS, an operating system
 Brain Electrical Oscillation Signature Profiling
 Beos Station, rail station in Indonesia

See also
 BEO (disambiguation)